This page is the filmography for designer Michael H. Riley. He has worked on title design for television series and feature films.

Television

Film

References

Riley, Michael